Yevdokiya Panteleyevna Mekshilo (23 March 1931 – 16 January 2013) was a female Soviet cross-country skier who competed in the 1960s for Armed Forces sports society. At the 1964 Winter Olympics, she won a gold in the 3 × 5 km relay and a silver in the 10 km event. She was born in Gorno-Altaysk.

References

External links
 
 
 

1931 births
2013 deaths
Soviet female cross-country skiers
Olympic cross-country skiers of the Soviet Union
Cross-country skiers at the 1964 Winter Olympics
Olympic gold medalists for the Soviet Union
Olympic silver medalists for the Soviet Union
Armed Forces sports society athletes
Olympic medalists in cross-country skiing
Medalists at the 1964 Winter Olympics

MEKS